The Al Mujaheddin Mosque is a mosque in Damansara Utama, Selangor, Malaysia. Located near the roundabout of Damansara Utama where Damansara Uptown is, the Al Mujaheddin Mosque is more than just a place of worship. In the compound, there is an Islamic school going by the name SRA Al-Mujahiddeen.

SRA stands for Sekolah Agama Rakyat or People's Religious School. It is where some Muslim residents send their children to get in-depth teachings on Islamic faith.

See also
 Islam in Malaysia
 GoogleMaps StreetView of Masjid Al-Mujahideen
GoogleMaps PhotoSphere of Masjid Al-Mujahideen Main Prayer Hall

Mosques in Selangor